Margaret of Cortona (1247 – 22 February 1297) was an Italian penitent of the Third Order of Saint Francis. She was born in Laviano, near Perugia, and died in Cortona. She was canonized in 1728.

She is the patron saint of the falsely accused, hoboes, homeless, insane, orphaned, mentally ill, midwives, penitents, single mothers, reformed prostitutes, stepchildren, and tramps.

Life
Margaret was born of farming parents, in Laviano, a little town in the diocese of Chiusi. At the age of seven, Margaret's mother died and her father remarried. Neither Margaret nor her stepmother liked each other. As she grew older, Margaret became more willful and reckless, and her reputation in the town suffered. At the age of 17 she met a young man, according to some accounts, the son of Gugliemo di Pecora, lord of Valiano, and she ran away with him. Soon Margaret found herself installed in the castle, not as her master's wife, for convention would never allow that, but as his mistress, which was more easily condoned. For ten years, she lived with him near Montepulciano and bore him a son.

When her lover failed to return home from a journey one day, Margaret became concerned. The unaccompanied return of his favorite hound alarmed Margaret, and the hound led her into the forest to his murdered body. That crime shocked Margaret into a life of prayer and penance. Margaret returned to his family all the gifts he had given her and left his home. With her child, she returned to her father's house, but her stepmother would not have her. Margaret and her son then went to the Franciscan friars at Cortona, where her son eventually became a friar. She fasted, avoided meat, and subsisted on bread and vegetables.

In 1277, after three years of probation, Margaret joined the Third Order of Saint Francis and chose to live in poverty. Following the example of Francis of Assisi, she begged for sustenance and bread. She pursued a life of prayer and penance at Cortona, and there established a hospital for the sick, homeless and impoverished. To secure nurses for the hospital, she instituted a congregation of Tertiary Sisters, known as "le poverelle" (Italian for "the little poor ones").

While in prayer, Margaret recounted hearing the words, "What is your wish, poverella?" ("little poor one?"), and she replied, "I neither seek nor wish for anything but You, my Lord Jesus." She also established an order devoted to Our Lady of Mercy and the members bound themselves to support the hospital and to help the needy.

On several occasions, Margaret participated in public affairs. Twice, claiming divine command, she challenged the Bishop of Arezzo, Guglielmo Ubertini Pazzi, in whose diocese Cortona lay, because he lived and warred like a prince. She moved to the ruined church of Basil of Caesarea, now Santa Margherita, and spent her remaining years there; she died on 22 February 1297.

Veneration
After her death, the Church of Santa Margherita in Cortona was rebuilt in her honor. Her body, found to be incorrupt even after 400 years, is preserved in a silver casket inside the church. Margaret was canonized by Pope Benedict XIII on 16 May 1728.

Margaret of Cortona is honored with a Lesser Feast on the liturgical calendar of the Episcopal Church in the United States of America on 22 February.

In art
Paintings depicting Margaret have been completed by Giovanni Lanfranco (1622) and Gaspare Traversi (c. 1758).

In 1938, the Italian composer Licinio Refice wrote his second opera, Margherita da Cortona based on the life of the Margaret, with libretto by Emidio Mucci.

A 1950 biographical film, Margaret of Cortona, by Mario Bonnard featured Maria Frau as Margaret.

See also
 List of Catholic saints
 Saint Margaret of Cortona, patron saint archive

References

External links 
 Sanctuary of Saint Margaret of Cortona

1247 births
1297 deaths
People from Castiglione del Lago
Italian Roman Catholic saints
13th-century Christian saints
Members of the Third Order of Saint Francis
Franciscan saints
Incorrupt saints
Female saints of medieval Italy
13th-century Italian Roman Catholic religious sisters and nuns
Anglican saints
Canonizations by Pope Benedict XIII
Venerated Catholics